The Pipestone Water Tower is a  concrete water tower in Pipestone, Minnesota, United States, which is listed on the National Register of Historic Places.  Unreliable rainfall and a lack of glacial lakes in the area necessitate the use of a tower to pump and store water from an underground reservoir.

History
The Pipestone Water Tower is unique in that it is one of only two water towers in the United States known to have been designed by architect L.P. Wolfe; its sister, the Brainerd Water Tower, is located in Brainerd, Minnesota. It was built to replace an aged steel standpipe tower built in the late 1880s. Construction on the structure was commenced by the Campbell Construction Company in 1920 for $24,610. Water service from the tower began on October 26, 1921 and continued until it was replaced by a larger tower in 1976. A restoration of the tower was undertaken in 1990, along with the construction of a new wayside rest area.

Structure
The  capacity tank is supported by a hollow supporting column which contains an unusual set of spiral windows and an internal staircase. The tower pumped and stored water from a  reservoir built below it at the time of its construction, releasing the water via gravity on demand.

Present day
The tower has become the center of the Water Tower Festival, a community celebration held in late June.

References

Buildings and structures in Pipestone County, Minnesota
Infrastructure completed in 1920
Towers completed in 1920
Water towers on the National Register of Historic Places in Minnesota
Water towers in Minnesota
National Register of Historic Places in Pipestone County, Minnesota
1920 establishments in Minnesota